Baby blue is a tint of azure, one of the pastel colors.

The first recorded use of baby blue as a color name in English was in 1892.

Variations of baby blue

Beau blue

Beau blue is a light tone of baby blue. "Beau" means "beautiful" in French.

The source of this color is the color that is called beau blue in the Plochere Color System, a color system formulated in 1948 that is widely used by interior designers.

Baby blue eyes

Baby blue eyes is a rich tone of baby blue.

The source of this color is the color that is called baby blue eyes in the Plochere Color System, a color system formulated in 1948 that is widely used by interior designers.

Little boy blue

Little boy blue is a deep tone of baby blue.

The source of this color is the "Pantone Textile Paper eXtended (TPX)" color list, color #16-4132 TPX—Little Boy Blue.

Baby blue in human culture

In Western culture, the color baby blue is often associated with baby boys (and baby pink for baby girls), particularly in clothing and linen and shoes.

In the late 1960s, philosopher Alan Watts, who lived in Sausalito, a suburb of San Francisco, suggested that police cars be painted baby blue and white instead of black and white. This proposal was implemented in San Francisco in the late 1970s, until the late 1980s. Watts also suggested that the police should wear baby blue uniforms because, he asserted, this would make them less likely to commit acts of police brutality than if they were wearing the usual dark blue uniforms.  This proposal was never implemented.

Baby blue is an official color used in the flag of Argentina.

Baby blue sky

The colour of the sky sometimes is baby blue.

See also 
 Light sky blue – a similar shade, named in the X11/html color family
 Baby pink
 List of colors
 Pinkstinks

References

Shades of azure
Shades of cyan
Shades of blue
1890s neologisms